Jordan Lee Pepper (born 31 July 1996 in Edenvale) is a South African racing driver, currently competing in the Blancpain GT Series Endurance Cup. He is the son of former South African Touring Car driver Iain Pepper and younger brother of W Series driver Tasmin Pepper.

He was the winner of the 2020 Bathurst 12 Hour for Bentley with Jules Gounon and Maxime Soulet. In 2023, he became a Lamborghini factory driver.

Career
After last taking part in the GT World Challenge Europe Endurance Cup in 2020 with Bentley, Pepper returned to the series in 2023. As a newly-minted Lamborghini factory driver, he joined fellow factory drivers Andrea Caldarelli and Mirko Bortolotti in Iron Lynx's Pro class entry. In the Sprint Cup, Pepper joined Franck Perera in Vincenzo Sospiri Racing's Pro class entry.

Racing Record

Career Summary

† As Pepper was a guest driver, he was ineligible for points.

*Season still in progress.

Complete Bathurst 12 Hour results

Complete WeatherTech SportsCar Championship results
(key) (Races in bold indicate pole position; results in italics indicate fastest lap)

References

External links
Official website
Profile at Driver Database

1996 births
Living people
South African racing drivers
People from Edenvale, Gauteng
Sportspeople from Gauteng
GT World Challenge America drivers
Blancpain Endurance Series drivers
ADAC GT Masters drivers
WeatherTech SportsCar Championship drivers
International GT Open drivers
Abt Sportsline drivers
Phoenix Racing drivers
Team Lazarus drivers
Nürburgring 24 Hours drivers
Lamborghini Squadra Corse drivers
Iron Lynx drivers
M-Sport drivers
Euronova Racing drivers